Millésimes (stylized as MillésimeS) is a compilation album by Pascal Obispo, released on 7 January 2013. Containing 35 tracks and 5 live tracks. The album also includes a large number of collaborations with other artists including Luz Casal, Natasha St-Pier, Youssou N'Dour, Melissa Mars,  Florent Pagny, Calogero and Johnny Hallyday.

Track list

2-CD standard edition
Disc one
"Plus que tout au monde" (4:14)
"Tu vas me manquer" (3:47)
"Où est l'élue" (4:55)
"Tombé pour elle" (4:07)
"Tu compliques tout" (4:18)
"Personne" (4:20)
"Il faut du temps" (4:25)
"Lucie" (4:15)
"Où et avec qui tu m'aimes" (3:41)
"L'important c'est d'aimer" (4:26)
"Pas besoin de regrets" (4:31)
"Ce qu'on voit... Allée Rimbaud" (3:50)
"Millésime" (3:49)
"Fan" (4:26)
"La prétention de rien" (3:56)
"Rosa"	(4:18)
"Les fleurs du bien" (4:20)
"Le chanteur idéal" (3:23)

Disc two
"Tu m'avais dit" (3:09)
"Comment veux tu que je t'aime?" (4:08)
"Le Drapeau" (3:56)
"Idéaliste" (Captain Samouraï Flower) (3:20)
"Si je manquais de ta peau" (4:40)
"Les Meilleurs Ennemis" (with participation of Zazie) (4:21)
"Soledad" (feat. Luz Casal) (4:25)
"Mourir demain" (feat. Natasha St-Pier) (4:08)
"So Many Men" (with Youssou N'Dour) (3:57)
"1980" (feat Melissa Mars) (4:02)
"Y'a pas un homme qui soit né pour ça" (feat. Florent Pagny & Calogero) (4:16)
"Nouveau voyage" (feat. Baby Bash) (3:41)
"Assassine" (live) (6:32)
"Sa raison d'être" (live) (4:34)
"Et un jour, une femme" (live) (feat. Florent Pagny) (5:05)
"Allumer le feu" (live) (feat. Johnny Hallyday) (6:13)
 "L'Envie d'aimer" (live) (6:31)

3-CD deluxe edition
Disc one
"Plus que tout au monde" (4:14)
"Tu vas me manquer" (3:47)
"Où est l'élue" (4:55)
"Tombé pour elle" (4:07)
"Tu compliques tout" (4:18)
"Personne" (4:20)
"Il faut du temps" (4:25)
"Lucie" (4:15)
"Où et avec qui tu m'aimes" (3:41)
"L'important c'est d'aimer" (4:26)
"Pas besoin de regrets" (4:31)
"Ce qu'on voit... Allée Rimbaud" (3:50)
"Millésime" (3:49)
"Fan" (4:26)
"La prétention de rien" (3:56)
"Rosa" (4:18)
"Les fleurs du bien" (4:20)
"Le chanteur idéal" (3:23)

Disc two
"Le Drapeau" (3:56)
"Idéaliste" (Captain Samouraï Flower) (3:20)
"Si je manquais de ta peau" (4:40)
"Les Meilleurs Ennemis" (with participation of Zazie) (4:21)
"Soledad" (feat. Luz Casal) (4:25)
"Mourir demain" (feat. Natasha St-Pier) (4:08)
"So Many Men" (with Youssou N'Dour) (3:57)
"1980" (feat Melissa Mars) (4:02)
"Y'a pas un homme qui soit né pour ça" (feat. Florent Pagny & Calogero) (4:16)
"Nouveau voyage" (feat. Baby Bash) (3:41)
"Je laisse le temps faire" (3:29)
"Assassine" (live) (6:32)
"Sa raison d'être" (live) (4:34)
"Et un jour, une femme" (live) (feat. Florent Pagny) (5:05)
"Allumer le feu" (live) (feat. Johnny Hallyday) (6:13)
 "L'Envie d'aimer" (live) (6:31)

Disc three
"Tu m'avais dit" (3:09)
"Comment veux tu que je t'aime?" (4:08)
"Savoir aimer [piano cordes]" (4:29)
"Y'a un ange" (5:59)
"Des p'tits trucs cons" (3:25)
"Qu'on ne me parle plus de toi duo Virginie Ledoyen [ECS]" (4:56)
"Si maman si" (3:51)
"Palais Royal" (3:33)
"Faut pas rêver" (4:01)
"Les mots bleus [duet with Christophe]" (5:57)
"Ailleurs land [demo]" (5:01)
"Où est l'élue [duet with Zazie] [demo]" (4:55)
"Tu trouveras [demo]" (4:22)
"Ma liberté de penser [demo]" (3:28)
"Rien ne se finit [demo]" (3:59)
"Ma bataille [demo]" (4:02)

Charts
It debuted at No. 2 on the French Albums Chart and reached No. 1 in its second week. It also reached number 1 in Ultratop 50, the French Belgian Wallonia Albums Chart.

Weekly charts

Year-end charts

References

2013 compilation albums